Sundre  is a town in central Alberta, Canada that is surrounded by Mountain View County.

Sundre takes its name from a town in Norway, the original home of Nels T. Hagen, the town's first postmaster.

History 
Sundre's first postmaster, Nels T. Hagen, arrived in 1906. Sundre incorporated as a village in 1950 and then as a town in 1956.

Demographics 

In the 2016 Census of Population conducted by Statistics Canada, the Town of Sundre recorded a population of 2,729 living in 1,188 of its 1,256 total private dwellings, a  change from its 2011 population of 2,610.

The Town of Sundre's 2012 municipal census counted a population of 2,695.

Economy 
Main industries in the area are petroleum production, forestry, agriculture, and ranching.

Arts and culture 
Cultural venues within Sundre include the Sundre Municipal Library and the Sundre & District Pioneer Village Museum, which features "Chester Mjolsness' World of Wildlife" exhibit of 150 taxidermy animals from across the world.

Notable people 
 Gord Miller, sportscaster
 Myron Thompson, politician

See also 
List of communities in Alberta
List of towns in Alberta

References

External links 

1949 establishments in Alberta
Mountain View County
Towns in Alberta